Labour Union (UP) is a minor social-democratic political party in Poland. It is a member of the Party of European Socialists (PES).

History 

Labour Union was formed in June 1992. The party contested the 1993 parliamentary elections, obtaining 7.28% of the popular vote and had 41 representatives elected to the lower house (Sejm). In the following parliamentary elections of 1997, UP received only 4.74% of votes, thereby falling short of the required 5% threshold for election to the Sejm. At the 2001 parliamentary elections, UP entered into an electoral alliance with the major Polish social-democratic party Democratic Left Alliance (SLD), and managed to get 16 of its members elected to parliament. Some of those members subsequently left UP to join the newly created Social Democracy of Poland (SDPL), a splinter group from the SLD. In May 2004, UP signed an alliance with SDPL, in which both parties agreed to jointly contest the following parliamentary elections under the SDPL banner, and to support the candidacy of Marek Borowski in the 2005 presidential election. At the 2005 parliamentary elections, SDPL gained only 3.9% of the vote, which was insufficient for the alliance to achieve parliamentary representation.

In 2006, UP joined SLD, SDPL and the liberal Democratic Party – demokraci.pl to form a centre-left electoral alliance named Left and Democrats (LiD) for the upcoming local elections. This electoral alliance was maintained for the 2007 parliamentary elections, and LiD came in third place with 13.2% of the vote, which saw 53 of its candidates elected to the Sejm. Unfortunately for UP, the party was the only one of the four component parties of the LiD alliance not to have any of its candidates elected.

In 2011 parliamentary elections its candidates joined the electoral lists of SLD. Again, none of them were elected.

They managed, however, to win one seat on the European Parliament elections in 2004, and hold it in the elections in 2009 and 2014.

In July 2015 the party joined the Zjednoczona Lewica (United Left) electoral alliance for the 2015 parliamentary elections. The alliance received 7.6% vote of the vote in the elections, below the 8% electoral threshold leaving it with no parliamentary representation. The alliance was dissolved in February 2016.

In the 2019 parliamentary election, Labour Union candidates ran on the Civic Coalition’s electoral lists and again, none of their candidates managed to get elected.

Election results

Sejm

Senate

Presidential

European Parliament

Leaders

 Waldemar Witkowski
 Marek Pol

Members of European Parliament
 Adam Gierek (2004–2019)

Important former members 

 Ryszard Bugaj, left in 1998
 Zbigniew Bujak, until c.1997
 Tomasz Nałęcz, left in 2004 to newly created Social Democracy of Poland
 Aleksander Małachowski, died January 26, 2004
 Izabela Jaruga-Nowacka, left in 2005, founded Union of the Left

References

External links
Home page 

1992 establishments in Poland
Former member parties of the Socialist International
Labour parties
Party of European Socialists member parties
Political parties established in 1992
Progressive parties
Social democratic parties in Poland